Teodoro Javier Ribera Neumann (born 25 May 1958) is a National Renewal politician and the former Minister of Foreign Affairs of Chile. He was the Minister of Justice from 2011 to 2012, and head of the Autonomous University of Chile from 1998 to 2011 and 2015 to 2019.

References

External Links
 BCN Profile

1958 births
Living people
Chilean Ministers of Justice
Foreign ministers of Chile
National Renewal (Chile) politicians
Heads of universities in Chile
University of Chile alumni
University of Würzburg alumni